Caliper Lake Provincial Park is a small provincial park in northwestern Ontario, near the township of Nestor Falls. The park occupies  alongside Caliper Lake. The facility is open for day use and overnight camping from mid-May to mid-September. The park features 83 campsites, many with electrical hookups, and some which may be rented for the entire season. The park offers many amenities, including a sandy beach, hiking trails, playground equipment, fish cleaning facilities, boat launches, bathrooms, and showers.  Canoes, kayaks, and bicycles are available for rental.

The park is known for its beautiful red and white pine trees. Fish found in the lake include northern pike, walleye, crappie, and smallmouth bass. Pelicans, cranes, ducks, loons, and bald eagles are just some of the birds that can be found on the lake.

The park was closed for overnight camping in 2013 by the Ontario Ministry of Natural Resources. The township of Sioux Narrows-Nestor Falls reached an agreement with the Ministry of Natural Resources for the township to assume operation of the park.

References

External links

Provincial parks of Ontario
Parks in Kenora District
Protected areas established in 1960
1960 establishments in Ontario